Eldridge Bluff is a prominent rock bluff  long, comprising that part of the west wall of Aviator Glacier immediately south of Cosmonaut Glacier, in Victoria Land. It was mapped by the United States Geological Survey from surveys and U.S. Navy air photos, 1960–64, and was named by the Advisory Committee on Antarctic Names for Lieutenant Commander David B. Eldridge, Jr., the U.S. Navy officer in charge of the winter detachment of Squadron VX-6 at McMurdo Station, 1967.

References 

Cliffs of Victoria Land
Borchgrevink Coast